Andrew Joseph "Fuzzy" Levane (April 11, 1920 – April 30, 2012) was an American professional basketball player and coach.  A 6'2" guard, he played collegiately at St. John's University.  He spent three years in the NBA and its predecessor league, the Basketball Association of America, playing for the Rochester Royals, the Syracuse Nationals and the Milwaukee Hawks.  In his final year with the Hawks he was a player-coach.

Levane coached the Hawks for one additional season, then coached the New York Knickerbockers.  He returned to the Hawks, now playing in St. Louis, for a final season in 1962.

Levane's son, Neil, a.k.a. Fuzzy, was a basketball star at Great Neck South high school on Long Island, New York from 1963 to 1967.  Following his senior season, he was listed as a fifth-team Parade Magazine All-American.  After playing for a year on the freshmen team at the University of Houston, he transferred to St. John's University in Queens where he played from 1968–70.

Andrew Levane died April 30, 2012, of heart failure, at the age of 92.

BAA/NBA career statistics

Regular season

Playoffs

References

External links
 BasketballReference.com: Andrew Levane (as coach)
 BasketballReference.com: Andrew Levane (as player)

1920 births
2012 deaths
American men's basketball players
Basketball coaches from New York (state)
Basketball players from New York City
James Madison High School (Brooklyn) alumni
Milwaukee Hawks head coaches
Milwaukee Hawks players
New York Knicks head coaches
Player-coaches
Rochester Royals players
Shooting guards
Small forwards
Sportspeople from Brooklyn
St. John's Red Storm men's basketball players
St. Louis Hawks head coaches
Syracuse Nationals players
Eastern Basketball Association coaches